HWF may refer to:

 Hawaiian Way Fund, an American non-profit organisation
 Human Welfare Foundation, an Indian humanitarian aid organisation associated with Jamaat-e-Islami Hind